Aleksandr Vyacheslavovich Tukmanov (born 28 April 1950) is a Russian professional football functionary and a former player.

As a player, he played 5 seasons in the Soviet Top League with FC Torpedo Moscow.

External links
 

1950 births
Living people
Footballers from Moscow
Soviet footballers
FC Torpedo Moscow players
FC Fakel Voronezh players
Association football defenders
FC Spartak Moscow players
FC Torpedo Moscow
Russian football chairmen and investors
FC Torpedo Vladimir players